Lefteris Mytilineos (24 April 1946 – 5 April 2021) was a Greek singer. He released around 20 full-length studio albums, on labels such as Columbia Records, CBS Records International, EMI and others.

Mytilineos died from COVID-19 in Corinth on 5 April 2021, during the COVID-19 pandemic in Greece. He was 74. 19 days before his 75th birthday.

Discography

He released the following albums:
	
 "Λευτέρης Μυτιληναίος" (Columbia, 1971)	
 "Νο 2" (EMI (re-release), 1974)	
 "Αυταπάτες" (Columbia, 1975, split album)	
 "Νο 3" (Columbia, 1975)		
 "Ένα Δάκρυ.."	(Columbia, 1977)		
 "Τα Φώτα Χαμηλώστε" (CBS, 1979)		
 "Πού Νάσαι"  (CBS, 1980)	
 "Θά Σέ Λησμονήσω" (CBS, 1981)	
 "Στάσου Μια Στιγμή" (CBS, 1983)	
 "Λίγο Πριν Ξημερώσει" (CBS, 1984)	
 "Θα Περιμένω"  (CBS, 1985)	
 "Ότι Έχω Και Δεν Έχω"  (CBS, 1986)	
 "Αντικανονικά... Σ' Αγαπώ" (Pan-Vox, 1987)		
 "Λαικό Ξεφάντωμα" (Pan-Vox, 1988, split album)	
 "Καμμιά Δεν Σου Μοιάζει" (EMI, 1988)	
 "Για Προδομένους" (EMI, 1990)	
 "Και Το Ρωτάς" (Music Box International, 1994)	
 "Μονάχα Δυο Βραδιές" (Music Box International, 1996)	
 "Η Δική Μου Υπογραφή" (Legend Recordings, 2002)

References

2021 deaths
1946 births
20th-century Greek male singers
21st-century Greek male singers
Deaths from the COVID-19 pandemic in Greece
People from Athens